Patricia Oillataguerre (born ) is an Argentine volleyball player. She is part of the Argentina women's national volleyball team.

She participated in the 2014 FIVB Volleyball World Grand Prix.
On club level she played for San Lorenzo in 2014.

References

External links
 Profile at FIVB.org

1988 births
Living people
Argentine women's volleyball players
Place of birth missing (living people)
Middle blockers
21st-century Argentine women